Alan R. Dean is a British ornithologist with a special interest in gulls and warblers. He lives in Solihull, West Midlands.

He is a member of the West Midland Bird Club and was an assistant editor of its Annual Reports for 1975–1980. He was a member of the British Birds Rarities Committee from 1984–1992 and in 2007 published a comprehensive account of the committee's history and publications. He has published a number of identification papers in British Birds. His papers and articles on Siberian chiffchaff have been of particular note. 
In 2010, the West Midland Bird Club conferred on him life membership, in recognition of his contribution to ornithology.

Bibliography

Books

The Birds of the West Midlands By Graham R. Harrison, Alan R. Dean, Alan J. Richards and David Smallshire, West Midland Bird Club  (1982)

Articles
Glaucous and Iceland Gulls in the west Midlands. British Birds 69:179 (1976)
 White-tailed Plover: new to Britain and Ireland. A. R. Dean, J. E. Fortey and E. G. Phillips. British Birds 70:465–471 (1977)
 Field characters of Isabelline and Brown Shrikes. British Birds 75:395-406 (1982)
 British status and identification of Greenish Warbler. British Birds 78:437-451, (1985)
 Seasonality of Herring Gulls in the west Midlands. British Birds 80: 632, (1987)
 Wintering Glaucous, Iceland and Herring Gulls in the Midlands. Birdwatch (2002)
 Siberian Chiffchaff revisited. A.R. Dean and Lars Svensson. British Birds 98:396-410 (2005)
 The British Birds Rarities Committee: a review of its history, publications and procedures. British Birds 100:149-176 (2007)
 Enigmatic grey-and-white Common Chiffchaffs. British Birds 100:497-499 (2007)
 Colour nomenclature and Siberian Chiffchaff. British Birds 101:146-149 (2008)
 The status in Britain of 'Siberian Chiffchaff'. Alan Dean, Colin Bradshaw, John Martin, Andy Stoddart and Grahame Walbridge. British Birds 103:320-338 (2010)
 How many Siberian Chiffchaffs are reaching Britain? British Birds 106: 282-283 (2013)

References

External links
Official website

English ornithologists
Year of birth missing (living people)
Living people